Michele Cervellini (born 14 April 1988) is a Sammarinese footballer who currently plays for S.S. Cosmos in San Marino.

He made 35 appearances for the San Marino national football team between 2009 and 2017.

External links

1988 births
Living people
Sammarinese footballers
San Marino international footballers
A.C. Juvenes/Dogana players
Association football midfielders
Campionato Sammarinese di Calcio players